Hans Irvine Ebeling  (1 January 1905 – 12 January 1980) was an Australian cricketer and cricket administrator.

Family
Ebeling's father, Arthur John Claus Frederick Ebeling (1863-1910), was of German descent. His mother was Mary Grace Ebeling (1869-1948), née Mochett, Hans Irvine Ebeling was born in Avoca, Victoria on 1 January 1905.

He married Myra Aileen Conry on 5 October 1936.

Education
Ebeling was educated at Caulfield Grammar School from 1919 to 1922, where he played cricket in the school's First XI, football (in the ruck, and at centre half-forward) in its First XVIII, and as a miler in its athletic team.

He dead-heated (with J. Manning of Camberwelll Grammar) for first place in the open mile race at the combined Associated Grammar School Sports meeting on 4 November 1921. In one match, against Camberwell Grammar in June 1922, he kicked 13 goals.

The association of parents who support school cricket at Caulfield Grammar is named after him. He is the only Caulfield Grammarian to have played Test cricket.

Cricket
He captained Victoria to two Sheffield Shield championships in four years (1934 and 1938), captained the Melbourne Cricket Club (MCC) to four premierships, and played in his sole Test match against England in 1934.

A Squadron-Leader in World War II, he served as a member of the board of the MCC—a body which oversees not only the club's sporting teams but also the operations of the Melbourne Cricket Ground (MCG)—for 45 years and was serving his first year as MCC President when he died. During this time, he helped to organise the 1977 Centenary Test between England and Australia at the MCG.

In 1999, the Melbourne Cricket Club selected him in its Team of the Century.

Military service
He served with the RAAF during World War II.

Death
He died at East Bentleigh on 12 January 1980 aged 75.

Footnotes

References
 World War Two Nominal Roll: Flight Lieutenant Hans Irvine Ebeling (252842), Department of Veterans' Affairs.

External links

MCC biography

1905 births
1980 deaths
Australia Test cricketers
People educated at Caulfield Grammar School
Victoria cricketers
Members of the Order of the British Empire
Melbourne Cricket Club cricketers
Australian cricketers
Cricketers from Victoria (Australia)
Australian people of German descent
D. G. Bradman's XI cricketers